is a 2007 Japanese film directed by Kei Horie and based on the manga  by Saika Kunieda. The film stars Takumi Saitoh as Noboru Fukami and Ryūnosuke Kawai as Kōhei Hayase. The film was released on July 28, 2007.

Plot
Noboru Fukami is a lonely and introverted college student who saves one of his classmates, Kōhei Hayase, from drowning on a lake. Hayase had never paid attention to Noboru before, but after being saved by him he begins to feel confused about his feelings towards the very mysterious Noboru. And if this was not enough, Hayase soon meets Noboru's twin brother, Ryū, who has a very different personality from his brother.

Cast
Takumi Saitoh as Noboru Fukami/Ryū Fukami
Tsubasa and Jun Ogasawara (young Noboru and Ryū)
Ryūnosuke Kawai as Kōhei Hayase
Yutsuki Katō as Sayuri Tadokoro
Makoto Sakamoto as Classmate
Goki as Classmate
Yū Tokui as Bartender
Kanji Tsuda as Teacher
Yumiko Oka as Classmate
Shirō Namiki
Himeko Tōya
Choi Cheol-ho
Yoshihiro Ishizuka
Shūji Ōtsuki

Production
The music was composed by Moku. The theme used for the end credits is "Karatsu youthful" by Jamgo Five.

References

External links
Official web site

2007 films
Live-action films based on manga
Films set in Japan
2000s Japanese-language films
Gay-related films
Japanese LGBT-related films
2007 romantic drama films
LGBT-related romantic drama films
2007 LGBT-related films
Japanese romantic drama films
2000s Japanese films